To All My Friends, Blood Makes the Blade Holy: The Atmosphere EP's is a double EP by American hip hop group Atmosphere. It was released on Rhymesayers Entertainment on September 7, 2010.

Commercial performance 
It debuted at number 38 on the Billboard 200 selling 9,400 copies in its first week.

Track listing

Charts

References

External links
 

2010 EPs
Atmosphere (music group) albums
Rhymesayers Entertainment EPs